The first season of Wildflower, a Philippine revenge drama television series on ABS-CBN, premiered on February 13, 2017 on ABS-CBN's Primetime Bida evening block and worldwide on The Filipino Channel and concluded on May 26, 2017, with a total of 73 episodes. The series stars the Dance Princess Maja Salvador, as Lily Cruz and Ivy Aguas, together with an ensemble cast consisting Tirso Cruz III, Aiko Melendez, Sunshine Cruz, and Wendell Ramos.

The first season of Wildflower chronicles the life of Lily Cruz, a girl whose parents were murdered by Emilia Ardiente, the matriarch of the Aridente clan. She was almost murdered, too, but managed to escape. Lily was adopted by Prianka Aguas, a billionaire businesswoman and philanthropist, and changed her identity to Ivy Aguas. After the death of Prianka, Lily returns to Poblacion Ardiente as Ivy Aguas, and this time stronger, braver, and ready to pursue her plans to avenge the deaths of her parents. She creates chaos in the family, while portraying as an ally to them, and also manipulating them.

Plot 
This story follows Lily Cruz (Maja Salvador), a beautiful and smart heiress who wants justice for her parents’ deaths by seeking revenge against the evil Ardiente family, a powerful political dynasty in the fictional province that bears their name.

Lily’s mother, Camia (Sunshine Cruz) is a school teacher and her father Dante (Christian Vasquez) is a public attorney. The Cruz family moves to the thriving and wealthy province of Poblacion Ardiente, where Dante gets an associate position in the Public Attorney’s office. Lily easily finds friends including Diego Torillo (Joseph Marco), the youngest son of the Ardiente family, one of the students who Camia tutors. The Ardiente family is the most powerful political dynasty in the province under the jurisdiction of Governor Julio Ardiente (Tirso Cruz III) and his daughter Emilia (Aiko Melendez), Mayor of the province. Emilia is married to businessman and known serial womanizer, Raul Torillo (Wendell Ramos). They have two sons, Arnaldo (RK Bagatsing) and Diego.

Complications follow when Raul is attracted to Camia. With the entitlement of the powerful, Raul assaults Camia prompting Dante to file rape charges against him. Unfortunately, the Ardientes do not take threats lightly.  Lily's world crumbles when Dante suspiciously dies from a heart attack and she witnesses her mother’s rape. Though targeted to be killed herself, the assassins feel compassion for the 9 year old and frees her instead. Lily fends for herself in another city until a wealthy woman, Prianka Aguas (Priscilla Meirelles) rescues her from life in the streets. Prianka legally adopts Lily and raises her to become tough, providing her with the resources to seek justice for her parents. Prianka later died from ovarian cancer and Lily inherits her fortune and returns to Poblacion Ardiente as Ivy Aguas.

With a billion dollar conglomerate behind her, Ivy is a magnet for the Ardientes who are preparing their campaign for the gubernatorial and congressional reelections. Ivy is reacquainted with Diego, who turns out to be the bastard son of Raul. Nonetheless, they fall in love and Diego renounces his family.

Cast and characters

Main 
 Maja Salvador as Lily Cruz / Ivy P. Aguas
 Tirso Cruz III as Julio Ardiente
 Joseph Marco as Diego Torillo
 Vin Abrenica as Jepoy Madrigal
 RK Bagatsing as Arnaldo Ardiente-Torillo
 Aiko Melendez as Emilia Ardiente-Torillo
 Sunshine Cruz as Camia Delos Santos-Cruz / Jasmine
 Wendell Ramos as Raul Torillo and Fake Jaguar

Supporting 
 Roxanne Barcelo as Natalie Alcantara
 Malou de Guzman as Lorena "Loring" Cervantes
 Bodjie Pascua as Leopnado "Pandoy" Cervantes
 Isay Alvarez-Seña as Clarita "Claire" De Guzman
 Ana Abad Santos as Carlotta Navarro
 Ingrid dela Paz as Nimfa Naig 
 Chinggoy Alonzo as Pablo Alcantara
 Jett Pangan as William Alvarez
 Arnold Reyes as Arthur Vergara
 Sheila Valderrama as Atty. Georgina Fisher

Recurring 
 Raul Montessa as Fernan Naig

Guest 
 Johnny Revilla
 Precious Lara Quigaman as Rosario
 Carla Martinez as Hon. Alice Rivera
 Uncredited as Maria

Special guest 
 Christian Vasquez as Atty. Dante Cruz 
 Priscilla Meirelles as Prianka Aguas
 Pinky Amador as Esmeralda De Guzman-Ardiente
 Xyriel Manabat as Young Lily Cruz / Ivy P. Aguas
 Ejay Falcon as Young Julio Ardiente
 Jesse James Ongteco as Young Diego Torillo
 Azi Villanueva as Young Jepoy Madrigal
 Izzy Canillo as Young Arnaldo Ardiente Torillo

Episodes

References

External links 
 

Wildflower (TV series)
2017 Philippine television seasons